These are the list of personnel changes in the NBA from the 1966–67 NBA season.

Events

August 3, 1966
 The Boston Celtics signed Art Heyman as a free agent.

September 1, 1966
 The Boston Celtics traded Mel Counts to the Baltimore Bullets for Bailey Howell.
 The Detroit Pistons sold Bob Warlick to the San Francisco Warriors.

September 7, 1966
 The Chicago Bulls traded Jim King, Jeff Mullins and cash to the San Francisco Warriors for Guy Rodgers.

September 14, 1966
 The Cincinnati Royals sold Tom Hawkins to the Los Angeles Lakers.

September 15, 1966
 The Cincinnati Royals traded Wayne Embry to the Boston Celtics for a 1967 3rd round draft pick (Sam Smith was later selected).

September 22, 1966
 The Los Angeles Lakers traded Leroy Ellis to the Baltimore Bullets for Jim Barnes.

September 23, 1966
 The Cincinnati Royals signed Bill Dinwiddie as a free agent.

October 11, 1966
 The Boston Celtics sold Johnny Austin to the Baltimore Bullets.

October 14, 1966
 The Chicago Bulls sold John Barnhill to the Baltimore Bullets.
 The Chicago Bulls sold Nate Bowman to the Philadelphia 76ers.

October 20, 1966
 The Baltimore Bullets waived Johnny Austin.

October 31, 1966
 The Baltimore Bullets sold Neil Johnson to the New York Knicks.

November 3, 1966
 The Baltimore Bullets fired Mike Farmer as head coach.
 The Baltimore Bullets appointed Buddy Jeannette as interim head coach.

November 10, 1966
 The St. Louis Hawks signed Tom Hoover as a free agent.

November 11, 1966
 The Philadelphia 76ers waived Ken Wilburn.

November 25, 1966
 The Chicago Bulls traded Len Chappell to the Cincinnati Royals for George Wilson.

December 5, 1966
 The Baltimore Bullets hired Gene Shue as head coach.

January 16, 1967
In a 3-team trade, the Baltimore Bullets traded Mel Counts to the Los Angeles Lakers; the Detroit Pistons traded Ray Scott to the Baltimore Bullets; and the Los Angeles Lakers traded Rudy LaRusso and a 1967 1st round draft pick (Sonny Dove was later selected) to the Detroit Pistons. Detroit got a 1st round draft pick in 1967 when LaRusso refused to report; LaRusso was later sold to San Francisco.

January 29, 1967
 The Baltimore Bullets sold Wayne Hightower to the Detroit Pistons.

February 17, 1967
 The Detroit Pistons signed Bob Hogsett as a free agent.

March 7, 1967
 Dave DeBusschere resigns as head coach for Detroit Pistons.
 The Detroit Pistons hired Donnie Butcher as head coach.

March 29, 1967
 The San Diego Rockets hired Jack McMahon as head coach.
 Jack McMahon resigns as head coach for Cincinnati Royals.

April 26, 1967
 The Los Angeles Lakers reassigned Head Coach Fred Schaus.
 The Los Angeles Lakers hired Butch Van Breda Kolff as head coach.

May 1, 1967
 The Seattle SuperSonics drafted Walt Hazzard from the Los Angeles Lakers in the NBA expansion draft.
 The Seattle SuperSonics drafted Henry Akin from the New York Knicks in the NBA expansion draft.
 The San Diego Rockets drafted Jim Barnett from the Boston Celtics in the NBA expansion draft.
 The San Diego Rockets drafted John Barnhill from the Baltimore Bullets in the NBA expansion draft.
 The San Diego Rockets drafted John Block from the Los Angeles Lakers in the NBA expansion draft.
 The Seattle SuperSonics drafted Nate Bowman from the Philadelphia 76ers in the NBA expansion draft.
 The Seattle SuperSonics drafted Dave Deutsch from the New York Knicks in the NBA expansion draft.
 The San Diego Rockets drafted Hank Finkel from the Los Angeles Lakers in the NBA expansion draft.
 The San Diego Rockets drafted Dave Gambee from the Philadelphia 76ers in the NBA expansion draft.
 The San Diego Rockets drafted Johnny Green from the Baltimore Bullets in the NBA expansion draft.
 The Seattle SuperSonics drafted Richie Guerin from the St. Louis Hawks in the NBA expansion draft.
 The San Diego Rockets drafted Toby Kimball from the Boston Celtics in the NBA expansion draft.
 The San Diego Rockets drafted Don Kojis from the Chicago Bulls in the NBA expansion draft.
 The Seattle SuperSonics drafted Tommy Kron from the St. Louis Hawks in the NBA expansion draft.
 The San Diego Rockets drafted Freddie Lewis from the Cincinnati Royals in the NBA expansion draft.
 The San Diego Rockets drafted Jon McGlocklin from the Cincinnati Royals in the NBA expansion draft.
 The Seattle SuperSonics drafted Tom Meschery from the San Francisco Warriors in the NBA expansion draft.
 The Seattle SuperSonics drafted Dorie Murrey from the Detroit Pistons in the NBA expansion draft.
 The Seattle SuperSonics drafted Bud Olsen from the San Francisco Warriors in the NBA expansion draft.
 The Seattle SuperSonics drafted Ron Reed from the Detroit Pistons in the NBA expansion draft.
 The Seattle SuperSonics drafted Rod Thorn from the St. Louis Hawks in the NBA expansion draft.
 The San Diego Rockets drafted Gerry Ward from the Cincinnati Royals in the NBA expansion draft.
 The San Diego Rockets drafted Jim Ware from the Cincinnati Royals in the NBA expansion draft.
 The Seattle SuperSonics drafted Ben Warley from the Baltimore Bullets in the NBA expansion draft.
 The Seattle SuperSonics drafted Ron Watts from the Boston Celtics in the NBA expansion draft.
 The Seattle SuperSonics drafted Bob Weiss from the Philadelphia 76ers in the NBA expansion draft.
 The Seattle SuperSonics drafted George Wilson from the Chicago Bulls in the NBA expansion draft.

May 2, 1967
 The Cincinnati Royals hired Ed Jucker as head coach.

June 19, 1967
 The Oakland Oaks signed Rick Barry as a free agent. Barry jumped to the ABA.

June 22, 1967
 The St. Louis Hawks signed Jay Miller as a free agent.

References
NBA Transactions at NBA.com
1966-67 NBA Transactions| Basketball-Reference.com

Transactions
NBA transactions